Ralph Eggleston (October 18, 1965 – August 28, 2022). was an American animator, art director, storyboard artist, and production designer at Pixar Animation Studios. He won the Academy Award for Best Animated Short Film for For the Birds.

Biography 
Born in Lake Charles, Louisiana, Eggleston graduated from the California Institute of the Arts before beginning his career as an animator in 1983. His first significant contribution was as the chief animator for the 1987 episode Family Dog for Steven Spielberg's anthology series Amazing Stories. Following this project he worked as an animator for Kroyer Films on numerous projects for television and film in the late 1980s and early 1990s, including serving as art director for the 1992 film FernGully: The Last Rainforest. He also worked as an animator on several projects with Walt Disney Animation Studios, including the films Aladdin (1992), The Lion King (1994), and Pocahontas (1995).

Eggleston began his career at Pixar in 1992, hired during the development of Toy Story, his work on which won him the Annie Award for Best Art Direction. He wrote and directed the Oscar-winning Pixar short film For the Birds. He worked as Production Designer on the film Inside Out for six years; this film received the Annie Award for Best Production Design.

Death
Eggleston died on August 28, 2022, at his San Rafael, California home, at the age of 56 years old, from a colon infection caused by a pancreatic tumor.

Filmography
 FernGully: The Last Rainforest (1992) (art director, animator)
 Aladdin (1992) (animator)
 The Lion King (1994) (animator)
 Pocahontas (1995) (animator)
 Toy Story (1995) (art director)
 A Bug's Life (1998) (art director)
 Toy Story 2 (1999) (art director)
 Fantasia 2000 (1999) (production designer)
 For the Birds (2000) (writer, director)
 Monsters, Inc. (2001) (storywriter/visual development)
 Finding Nemo (2003) (production designer)
 The Incredibles (2004) (art director)
 Cars (2006) (art director)
 Ratatouille (2007) (character designer)
 WALL-E (2008) (production designer)
 Up (2009) (character art director)
 The Princess and the Frog (2009) (additional story material)
 Cars 2 (2011) (development artist)
 Inside Out (2015) (production designer)
 Riley's First Date? (2015) (production designer)
 Finding Dory (2016) (special thanks)
 Incredibles 2 (2018) (production designer)
 Soul (2020) (development artist)
 Elemental (2023) (posthumous release, dedicated in memory)

References

External links
 
 Audio interview with Eggleston (04/06)
 Teen's interview Ralph Eggleston
 "Ken Breuce and Ralph Eggleston notes from CalArts Character Animation lecture"
 Feb-3-2006:Pixar visit #3 Ralph Eggelston and Ken Bruce
 From script to DVD interview
 Design with a Purpose, Interview with Ralph Eggleston AD of Wall-E.

1965 births
2022 deaths
American art directors
Animators from Louisiana
American storyboard artists
Directors of Best Animated Short Academy Award winners
California Institute of the Arts alumni
American production designers
Artists from Baton Rouge, Louisiana
People from Lake Charles, Louisiana
Annie Award winners
Pixar people
Deaths from cancer in California
Deaths from pancreatic cancer